That's All That Matters (German: ...und das ist die Hauptsache!?) is a 1931 German musical comedy film directed by Joe May and starring Nora Gregor, Harry Liedtke and Ursula Grabley. It was shot at the Babelsberg Studios in Potsdam. The film's sets were designed by the art director Otto Hunte. It premiered at the Gloria-Palast in Berlin.

Cast
Nora Gregor as Renée Roettlinck  
Harry Liedtke as Werner Roettlinck
Ursula Grabley as Pixi
Robert Thoeren as The Prince
Agnes Bernauer as Peterle, son
Ferdinand Hart as Bittrich
Otto Wallburg as Klöppel, painter
Fritz Odemar as Detective Commissioner Schierling  
Jakob Tiedtke as Wilhelm, servant in Roettlinck 
Julius Falkenstein as Ball visitor 
Ernst Duschy as ragman
Julius E. Herrmann
Trude Lehmann
Rolf Müller
Ernst Pröckl
Toni Tetzlaff
Viktor Schwannecke

References

External links

Films of the Weimar Republic
German musical comedy films
1931 musical comedy films
Films directed by Joe May
Films produced by Joe May
German black-and-white films
1930s German films
Films shot at Babelsberg Studios
1930s German-language films